The 2010–11 Colorado Eagles season was the eighth season of the CHL franchise in Loveland, Colorado.

Regular season

Conference standings

Playoffs

Playoff Bracket

Awards and records

Awards

Milestones

Transactions

Final roster

See also
 2010–11 CHL season

References

External links
 2010–11 Colorado Eagles season at Pointstreak

C
C